Social Democratic Party of Madagascar (PSD) is a political party in Madagascar.

History
The party was founded in 1956 in Majunga district as the Social Democratic Party of Madagascar and the Comoros. It was led by Philibert Tsiranana, a member of the French National Assembly. Tsiranana had joined the French Section of the Workers' International (SFIO) group, and the French SFIO government aided the construction of the PSD. The party campaigned for continued links with France in the 1958 referendum. PSD allied itself with the Socialist Democratic Union of Madagascar, forming the Republican Cartel.

Electoral history

Presidential elections

National Assembly elections

See also 
:Category:Social Democratic Party of Madagascar politicians

References

Political parties in Madagascar
Political parties established in 1956
Social democratic parties